"Americana" is a song recorded by American country music artist Moe Bandy. It was released in January 1988 as the first single from his album No Regrets. The song peaked at number 8 on the Billboard Hot Country Singles chart, and to date is his last top 10 single.

Content
The song is a salute to small-town America and a celebration of its values and camaraderie. Various observations – elderly men playing checkers, children playing hopscotch and teenagers going on a date at a local soda fountain – are observed first-person style from a traveling performer, whose vehicle had pulled off of a four-lane highway for a short break. The song was written by Larry Alderman, Richard Fagan and Patti Ryan noted Nashville songwriters.

Charts

Weekly charts

Year-end charts

References

1988 singles
Moe Bandy songs
Curb Records singles
Songs written by Richard Fagan
Song recordings produced by Jerry Kennedy
1988 songs